The Skete of the Annunciation of the Theotokos is a skete of the Monastery of Xenophontos, on Mount Athos, Greece.

The skete was founded in 1766 by the hieromonk Sylvester, and the monks Efrem and Agapios.

Today the skete consists of 26 residences occupied by 10 monks, a library holding 360 hand written codexes and 500 prints, and a church built in 1766 containing 100 icons and the relics of St. Charalampos and St. Modestos.

References

Annunciation
Greek Orthodox monasteries
Xenophontos Monastery